Colonel (Retired) Tom Butime (born 1947) is a Ugandan politician. He is the Cabinet Minister of Tourism, Wildlife and Antiquities in the Ugandan Cabinet. He concurrently serves as the elected representative for Mwenge County Central, Kyenjojo District, in the 10th Ugandan Parliament (2016–2021).

He served as State Minister for Communications from 13 January 2005 until February 2006. After the general elections in February 2006, he was named State Minister for Karamoja Affairs, a posting he declined to assume. In 2011, Butime contested for the position of Representative of Mwenge County North, but lost to David Muhumuza.

Previously, Butime was the Minister of Internal Affairs from July 6, 1996 to July 2001, and he also served as Minister of State for Refugees and Disaster Preparedness during that time. From 2001 until a cabinet reshuffle in January 2005, Butime served as Minister of State for International Cooperation and served as acting Foreign Minister from March 2004 to January 2005.

He is a trained Cinematographer. His hobby is soccer, with Manchester United as his favourite Premier league side. He also enjoys farming.

See also
 Cabinet of Uganda
 Parliament of Uganda

References

1947 births
Living people
Foreign Ministers of Uganda
Members of the Parliament of Uganda
People from Kyenjojo District
National Resistance Movement politicians
21st-century Ugandan politicians
People educated at St. Leo's College, Kyegobe